Ulysses Llanez Jr. (born April 2, 2001) is an American professional soccer player who plays as a winger for Austrian club St. Pölten, on loan from VfL Wolfsburg. He also represents the United States national team.

Club career
Llanez made his professional debut for LA Galaxy II in a 0–2 loss to Phoenix Rising FC on August 6, 2017, coming on as an 88th-minute substitute for Josh Turnley.

On his 18th birthday, April 2, 2019, Llanez announced that he had signed a professional contract to play for the German side VfL Wolfsburg. On September 15, 2020, Dutch Eredivisie side SC Heerenveen announced that they had signed Llanez on loan through the end of the 2020–21 season.

In July 2021, Llanez joined Austrian Second League side St. Pölten on loan.

International career
Llanez was born in the United States and is of Mexican descent. He was previously called to youth training camps for the Mexico U-16 squad in 2017 but never made an appearance. Since then, he has represented the United States at the U-17, U-18, U-19, U-20, and senior levels.

A regular starter for the United States at the U-20 level, he was an integral part of the United States team at the 2019 FIFA U-20 World Cup. On December 30, 2019, Llanez was called up to the senior squad for the first time. On February 1, 2020, Llanez made his senior debut for United States, starting and scoring the only goal in 1–0 friendly win over Costa Rica.

On November 3, 2020, Llanez was named to the United States senior squad for two friendlies against Wales and Panama.

Career statistics

International

Scores and results list United States' goal tally first, score column indicates score after each Llanez goal.

Honors
United States U20
CONCACAF U-20 Championship: 2018

Individual
CONCACAF Under-20 Championship Best XI: 2018

References

External links

 
 

2001 births
Living people
Association football forwards
American soccer players
American sportspeople of Mexican descent
LA Galaxy II players
People from Lynwood, California
Eredivisie players
SC Heerenveen players
Soccer players from California
Sportspeople from Los Angeles County, California
United States men's under-20 international soccer players
United States men's youth international soccer players
USL Championship players
United States men's international soccer players
VfL Wolfsburg players
Expatriate footballers in the Netherlands